Pygmaepterys kurodai is a species of sea snail, a marine gastropod mollusk in the family Muricidae, the murex snails or rock snails.

Description

Distribution
This marine species occurs off Honshu Island, Japan.

References

External links
 Nakamigawa K. & Habe T. (1964). Descriptions of two new muricid species dedicated to Dr. Kuroda's 77th birthday. Venus. 23(1): 25-29, pl. 2

Muricidae
Gastropods described in 1964